This is the results breakdown of the local elections held in the Basque Country on 26 May 2019. The following tables show detailed results in the autonomous community's most populous municipalities, sorted alphabetically.

Opinion polls

Overall

City control
The following table lists party control in the most populous municipalities, including provincial capitals (shown in bold). Gains for a party are displayed with the cell's background shaded in that party's colour.

Municipalities

Barakaldo
Population: 100,435

Basauri
Population: 40,762

Bilbao
Population: 345,821

Donostia-San Sebastián
Population: 186,665

Errenteria
Population: 39,355

Getxo
Population: 78,276

Irun
Population: 61,983

Portugalete
Population: 45,826

Santurtzi
Population: 45,725

Vitoria-Gasteiz
Population: 249,176

Juntas Generales

References

Basque Country
2019